Mokër is a geographical region in Southeastern Albania, composed by 47 villages, which are all above 1,000m from sea level. The region is composed of two subregions, Upper Mokër (Mokra e Sipërme) and Lower Mokër (Mokra e Poshtme). As a result of 2013, several villages have been abandoned.

References

Albanian regions
Albanian ethnographic regions